Liechtensteiner cuisine is the cuisine of Liechtenstein. The cuisine is diverse and has been influenced by the cuisine of nearby countries, particularly Switzerland and Austria, and is also influenced by Central European cuisine. Cheeses and soups are integral parts of Liechtensteiner cuisine. Milk products are also commonplace in the country's cuisine, due to an expansive dairy industry. Common vegetables include greens, potatoes and cabbage. Widely consumed meats include beef, chicken and pork. The consumption of three meals a day is commonplace, and meals are often formal.

Common foods and dishes

 Asparagus is frequently used
 Bread
 Hafalaab a soup with ham or bacon and cornmeal dumplings
 Kasknopfl small dumplings topped with cheese or onions
 Liver
 Muesli uncooked rolled oats, fruit and nuts that have been soaked in water or juice
 Pastries
 Ribel a grain
 Rösti a dish prepared with coarsely grated potato that is fried. It may include regional variations that utilize additional ingredients
 Sandwiches
 Saukerkas a cheese produced in Liechtenstein
 Schnitzel a breaded cutlet dish made with boneless meat thinned with a mallet.
 Smoked meats
 Torkarebl a porridge dish that resembles dumplings
 Wurst smoked sausages
 Yogurt

Common beverages
 Beer
 Cocoa
 Coffee
 Milk consumed as a beverage by many Liechtensteiners
 Wine

See also

 Liechtenstein wine

References

Further reading
  Includes information about Liechtensteiner cuisine

External links

 
European cuisine
Liechtenstein culture